Tuting Advanced Landing Ground  is an Indian Air Force airstrip located at Tuting in Upper Siang district of Arunachal Pradesh, India on the banks of River Siang. NH-913 Arunachal Frontier Highway will pass through Jido suburb of Tuting immediately south of the airstrip.

History

The airstrip was used during 1962 Indo-China War and was abandoned later. In 2008 plan to review the airstrip was approved and in 2016 the airstrip was reviewed with new runway and allied facilities as an Indian Airforce Advanced Landing Ground. The airstrip is used for bring in vital supplies from Assam via aircraft and helicopters.

See also

 Indo-China Border Roads
 List of Indian Air Force stations
 Sino-Indian border dispute

References

Upper Siang district
Airports in Arunachal Pradesh
Indian Air Force bases
Airports with year of establishment missing